Prince Felix may refer to:

Felix Yussupov (1887–1967), one of the murderers of Grigory Rasputin
Prince Felix of Bourbon-Parma (1893–1970), husband of Grand Duchess Charlotte of Luxembourg
 Prince Félix of Luxembourg (born 1984), son of Grand Duke Henri of Luxembourg
 Prince Felix of Denmark (born 2002), son of Prince Joachim of Denmark